Spondylocostal dysostosis, also known as Jarcho-Levin syndrome (JLS), is a rare, heritable axial skeleton growth disorder. It is characterized by widespread and sometimes severe malformations of the vertebral column and ribs, shortened thorax, and moderate to severe scoliosis and kyphosis. Individuals with Jarcho-Levin typically appear to have a short trunk and neck, with arms appearing relatively long in comparison, and a slightly protuberant abdomen. Severely affected individuals may have life-threatening pulmonary complications due to deformities of the thorax. The syndrome was first described by Saul Jarcho and Paul M. Levin at Johns Hopkins University in 1938.

Genetics

Types include:

Diagnosis

Subtypes and characteristics
In 1968, Dr. David Rimoin and colleagues in Baltimore first distinguished between the two major presentations of Jarcho-Levin. Both conditions were characterized as failures of proper vertebral segmentation. However, the condition within the family described in their article appeared to be inherited in an  autosomal dominant fashion and had a less severe course than that reported by other investigators. They specified their condition as spondylocostal dysplasia, which has since become known as spondylocostal dysostosis. The subtype of Jarcho-Levin with which they contrasted their reported cases to is now known as spondylothoracic dysplasia.

Spondylothoracic dysplasia
Spondylothoracic dysplasia, or STD, has been repeatedly described as an  autosomal recessively inherited condition that results in a characteristic fan-like configuration of the ribs with minimal intrinsic rib anomalies. Infants born with this condition typically died early in life due to recurrent respiratory infections and pneumonia due to their restricted thorax. Recently, a report has documented that actual mortality associated with STD is only about 50%, with many survivors leading healthy, independent lives.

Spondylocostal dysostosis

In contrast to STD, the subtype spondylocostal dysostosis, or SCD features intrinsic rib anomalies, in addition to vertebral anomalies. Intrinsic rib anomalies include defects such as bifurcation, broadening and fusion that are not directly related to the vertebral anomalies (such as in STD, where extensive posterior rib fusion occurs due to segmentation defects and extreme shortening of the thoracic vertebral column). In both subtypes, the pulmonary restriction may result in pulmonary hypertension, and have other potential cardiac implications.

Management

Prognosis

Babies born with Jarcho-Levin may be very healthy and grow up to lead normal lives. However, many individuals with Jarcho-Levin suffer from problems of respiratory insufficiency secondary to volume-restricted thoraces. These individuals will often develop pulmonary complications and die in infancy or early childhood. The disparity in outcomes of those with the syndrome is related to the fact that Jarcho-Levin actually encompasses two or more distinct syndromes, each with its own range of prognoses. The syndromes currently recognized as subtypes of Jarcho-Levin are termed spondylothoracic dysplasia and spondylocostal dysostosis. The disease is related to the SRRT gene.

Epidemiology
To date about 20 cases of Spondylocostal dysostosis have been reported in literature.

Terminology
"Type 1" is also known as "Jarcho-Levin syndrome", or "JLS".

While clinicians almost unanimously refer to the syndrome as "Jarcho-Levin", reports have variously labelled or referred to the condition as all of the following: Hereditary malformations of the vertebral bodies, hereditary multiple hemivertebrae, syndrome of bizarre vertebral anomalies, spondylocostal dysplasia, spondylothoracic dysplasia, costovertebral anomalies, costovertebral dysplasia, spondylothoracic dysplasia, occipito-facial-cervico-thoracic-abdomino-digital dysplasia (deemed "ridiculously long" and "unwarranted" by OMIM), and spondylocostal dysostosis.

A closely related condition termed "Costovertebral segmentation defect with mesomelia and peculiar facies", or Covesdem syndrome, was first described in 1978 in India.

References

Further reading
 GeneReviews/NIH/NCBI/UW entry on Spondylocostal Dysostosis, Autosomal Recessive.

External links 

Genetic disorders by system